Dana Vavřačová (born 25 June 1954 in Jablonec nad Nisou) is a retired Czech race walker.

In the 3000 metres walk she finished fourth at the 1985 World Indoor Games, the 1987 World Indoor Championships and the 1987 European Indoor Championships. She then won the silver medal at the 1988 European Indoor Championships, finished ninth at the 1989 World Indoor Championships and fourth again at the 1990 European Indoor Championships. In the 10 kilometres distance she finished tenth at the 1987 World Championships and thirteenth at the 1986 European Championships. She became Czechoslovakian champion in 1984, 1985, 1986 and 1987.

International cometptions

References

1954 births
Living people
Sportspeople from Jablonec nad Nisou
Czech female racewalkers
Czechoslovak female racewalkers
World Athletics Championships athletes for Czechoslovakia